EMI was an Italian professional cycling team that existed from 1959 to 1961. Charly Gaul won the general classification of the 1959 Giro d'Italia with the team.

References

External links

Cycling teams based in Italy
Defunct cycling teams based in Italy
1959 establishments in Italy
1961 disestablishments in Italy
Cycling teams established in 1959
Cycling teams disestablished in 1961